Brooklyn Horror Film Festival is an annual film festival in Brooklyn, New York. It was founded in 2016.

With the 2020 edition of the festival cancelled due to the COVID-19 pandemic in the United States, it was one of the partners in the Nightstream online festival.

Festivals by year

2016

The first annual festival took place from October 14–16, 2016. The festival took place in multiple theaters including Wythe Hotel Cinema, Videology, Spectacle Theater and Syndicated Theater.

World premieres 
 Child Eater Dir. Erlingur Ottar Thoroddsen
 Psychotic! A Brooklyn Slasher Dir. Maxwell Frey & Derek Gibbons

North American premieres 
 Broken Dir. Shaun Robert Smith

US premieres 
 Without Name Dir. Lorcan Finnegan Best Feature, Best Director, Best Editing, Best Cinematography 
 Let Her Out Dir. Cody Calahan
 Therapy Dir. Nathan Ambrosioni 
 Fury Of The Demon Dir. Fabien Delage

East Coast premieres 
 Dearest Sister Dir. Mattie Do
 We Are The Flesh Dir. Emiliano Rocha Minter Best Actor Noé Hernández (actor)

New York premieres 
 Beyond The Gates Dir. Jackson Stewart Audience Award Winner  
 Trash Fire Dir. Richard Bates Jr. Best Actress Angela Trimbur
 The Master Cleanse Dir. Bobby Miller Best Effects 
 Pet Dir. Carles Torrens

Retrospective screenings 
 The Sentinel Dir. Michael Winner

Short Films 
 Nightmare Fuel: Scary Horror Shorts: Pigskin, The Puppet Man, Tilly, Playback, The Sticks, The Home, The Stylist
 Head Trip: Alternative Horror Shorts: Disco Inferno (dir. Alice Waddington), Eveless, The Push, Empty Bed, Venefica, Shorty
 Local's Only: Shorts by Brooklyn filmmakers: Mute, Chambers, Last Stop Coney Island, Stitched, ETA, The Toothbrush, Wandering

Special events 
 Grady Hendrix's Summerland Lost: A Ghost Story
 Critical Drinking
 Apparition: A Popup Art Show
 Ghosts We've Known: Storytelling Competition
 Tears - Live music performance by Dani Marie and Johnny Butler

Notes

External links
 

Fantasy and horror film festivals in the United States
Film festivals in New York City
Multigenre conventions
Horror conventions